Stevica Kuzmanovski (born 16 November 1962) is a Macedonian football manager and former player.

Playing career
During his career that spanned from the early 1980s to the early 2000s, Kuzmanovski played for Partizan, Pelister, OFK Beograd (three spells), Rad (two spells), Kocaelispor, Galatasaray, Antalyaspor, and Eskişehirspor.

Managerial career
After three years as an assistant at OFK Beograd, Kuzmanovski was appointed as the club's manager in July 2003. He later served as manager of Belasitsa Petrich (October 2005–September 2006), Slavia Sofia, Montana (twice), and Banants (December 2009–May 2011).

References

External links
 
 
 
 
 

1962 births
Living people
Sportspeople from Tetovo
Yugoslav footballers
Macedonian footballers
Association football defenders
FK Partizan players
FK Pelister players
OFK Beograd players
FK Rad players
Kocaelispor footballers
Galatasaray S.K. footballers
Antalyaspor footballers
Eskişehirspor footballers
Yugoslav First League players
Yugoslav Second League players
Süper Lig players
First League of Serbia and Montenegro players
Macedonian expatriate footballers
Expatriate footballers in Turkey
Expatriate footballers in Serbia and Montenegro
Macedonian expatriate sportspeople in Turkey
Macedonian expatriate sportspeople in Serbia and Montenegro
Macedonian football managers
OFK Beograd managers
OFC Belasitsa Petrich managers
PFC Slavia Sofia managers
FC Montana managers
FC Urartu managers
Armenian Premier League managers
Serbian SuperLiga managers
Macedonian expatriate football managers
Expatriate football managers in Serbia and Montenegro
Expatriate football managers in Bulgaria
Expatriate football managers in Armenia
Expatriate football managers in Serbia
Macedonian expatriate sportspeople in Bulgaria
Macedonian expatriate sportspeople in Armenia
Macedonian expatriate sportspeople in Serbia